Anatolian Leopard is a drama film, directed by Emre Kayış and released in 2021. A co-production of companies from Turkey, Poland, Germany, and Denmark, the film stars Uğur Polat as Fikret, the director of a failing zoo in Ankara who must conspire with his assistant Gamze (Ipek Türktan) to hide the fact that the zoo's Anatolian leopard has died, as the animal's protected status is the only thing preventing the zoo from being shut down and sold off to real estate developers to build a new amusement park.

The film's cast also includes Hatice Aslan, Ezgi Gör, Ege Aydan, Koray Ergün, Emrah Ozdemir, Andy Boyns, and Nuri Gökasan.

The film premiered in the Discovery program at the 2021 Toronto International Film Festival, where it was named the winner of the FIPRESCI Prize.

References

External links

2021 films
2021 comedy-drama films
Danish comedy-drama films
German comedy-drama films
Polish comedy-drama films
Turkish comedy-drama films
2020s Turkish-language films